Babuzai may refer to:

 Babuzai (Pashtun tribe)
 Union Council Babozai in Mardan
 Tehsil Babuzai in Swat